Azteca Uno (previously Azteca Trece), is a Mexican national broadcast television network owned by TV Azteca, with more than 100 transmitters across the country. Azteca Uno broadcasts on virtual channel 1. Azteca Uno programming is available in Mexico on satellite via Sky and Dish Network, as well as all Mexican cable systems, and some Azteca Uno programming were seen in the United States on Azteca América.

History

Establishment of XHDF

Azteca Trece took its historic channel number (13) from XHDF-TV, which signed on in 1968 on channel 13. It was owned by Francisco Aguirre's Organización Radio Centro through concessionaire Corporación Mexicana de Radio y Televisión, S.A. de C.V. The station had fewer resources compared to its Mexico City competitors, Telesistema Mexicano and Televisión Independiente de México, and relied on foreign films and series, supplied primarily by Eurovision, to fill out its broadcast day.

In 1972, due to debts owed to the state-owned Sociedad Mexicana de Crédito Industrial (Mexican Industrial Credit Society or SOMEX), XHDF and concessionaire Corporación Mexicana de Radio y Televisión were nationalized.

The first director of the government-owned Canal 13 was Antonio Menéndez González, and after his death, he was succeeded by Enrique González Pedrero, senator of the state of Tabasco from the PRI. Corporación Mexicana de Radio y Televisión, along with another state-owned enterprise, Tele-Radio Nacional, began receiving new television concessions as part of a national expansion of the Mexico City station into a national television network.

One of the first orders of business for Canal 13 was a relocation. On July 14, 1976, Canal 13's new facilities in the Ajusco area of Mexico City were formally inaugurated by President Luis Echeverría. The event was attended by various figures from the political and business sectors of the country, including Secretary of the Interior Mario Moya Palencia and Secretary of Communications and Transportation Eugenio Méndez Docurro, as well as Emilio Azcárraga Milmo, Romulo O'Farrill and Miguel Aleman Velasco, who served as directors of Televisa.

In 1983, the Mexican government reorganized its broadcast holdings. The result was the creation of the Mexican Television Institute, which changed its name to Imevisión in 1985. Imevisión comprised not only Canal 13, now known as Red Nacional 13, but the former Televisión de la República Mexicana, with its channel 22 station, and a new network known as Red Nacional 7 and broadcast in Mexico City by the brand-new XHIMT-TV channel 7.

During the Imevisión years, Red Nacional 13 continued to broadcast commercial programming, although it featured some programs with a cultural focus, such as Temas de Garibay, Entre Amigos with Alejandro Aura, and several programs with journalist Jorge Saldaña.

Privatization

In 1990, Imevisión collapsed the 7 and 13 national networks into one, retaining the stronger channel 13 branding. At this time, the first of two attempts to privatize Imevisión was made, meeting with no bidders.

In 1993, the administration of Carlos Salinas de Gortari auctioned off Imevisión and some other government-owned media ventures in various packages. Radio Televisión del Centro, headed by electronics store owner Ricardo Salinas Pliego, bought all of the TV stations. The result was the creation of Televisión Azteca, which took its name from the holding company created for the largest of the packages: the Red Nacional 13, including XHDF.

Programs
Azteca Uno is the home of most of TV Azteca's domestic output, especially telenovelas, entertainment programs, and news.

Entertainment
Azteca Uno features two entertainment programs on its weekday schedule. Its morning show, Venga la Alegría, airs from 8:55 to noon and competes against similar offerings from Las Estrellas and Imagen Televisión. An afternoon show, Ventaneando, is more focused on entertainment news, and airs at 4pm.

News

Azteca Uno airs three editions of Hechos, Azteca's primary newscast, in the morning, at lunchtime and at 10pm. All three beat Televisa's competing newscasts in the ratings in September 2016.

AZ Mundo
The network also operates an international version of Azteca Trece as AZ Mundo (formerly Azteca 13 Internacional), reaching 13 countries in North, Central and South America. On July 15, 2004, the CRTC in Canada denied a request for Azteca 13 Internacional to be broadcast via digital cable and satellite.  However, a second subsequent request was approved on January 20, 2006. On September 15, 2015, Azteca 13 International was renamed AZ Mundo.  The channel is available in Canada on Rogers Digital Cable, Vidéotron & Bell Fibe TV.

Azteca Uno transmitters
Azteca Uno is available on 91 of its own transmitters as well as on a subchannel of 13 Azteca 7 transmitters. The latter only carry Azteca Uno in standard definition.

As part of the national virtual channel realignment of October 2016, Azteca Trece, including in Mexico City, moved from channel 13 to channel 1. The move allowed it to leapfrog Las Estrellas, its primary competitor, which remained on channel 2; it also ultimately led to the rename of the network as Azteca Uno effective January 1, 2018.

|-

|-

|-

|-

|-

|-

|-

|-

|-

|-

|-

|-

|-

|-

|-

|-

|-

|-

|-

|-

|-

|-

|-

|-

|-

|-

|-

|-

|-

|-

|-

|-

|-

|-

|-

|-

|-

|-

|-

|-

|-

|-

|-

|-

|-

|-

|-

|-

|-

|-

|-

|-

|-

|-

|-

|-

|-

|-

|-

|-

|-

|-

|-

|-

|-

|-

|-

|-

|-

|-

|-

|-

|-

|-

|-

|-

|-

|-

|-

|-

|-

|-

|-

|-

|-

|-

|-

|-

|-

|}

References

External links
  

 
Television channels and stations established in 1972
Television networks in Mexico
TV Azteca broadcast television networks
Mexican companies established in 1972